Bernard Benesh (17 August 1891 in Graben – 17 September 1964 in Burrville in Morgan County, Tennessee) was an American entomologist who specialised in Lucanidae.

Benesh immigrated to the United States in 1909. He first lived in Chicago where he worked in a steel mill. He served in the United States Army's 1st Cavalry Regiment, rose to the rank of Sergeant, and left after the end of World War I. Later, in poor health, he retired and moved to Burrville, in Morgan County, Tennessee. He collaborated with the Field Museum of Natural History in Chicago where his collection is preserved. Benesh published numerous papers between 1932 and 1960 and in 1960 he published Coleopterorum Catalogus Supplementa, pars 8: Lucanidae. W. Junk, Gravenhage, Netherlands. 178 pp. a World catalogue of the 800 or so species.

External links
 

1891 births
1964 deaths
American entomologists
United States Army personnel of World War I
Carniolan people
People from Morgan County, Tennessee
Austro-Hungarian emigrants to the United States
United States Army soldiers
20th-century American zoologists
20th-century American male writers